DYAR (765 AM) Sonshine Radio is a radio station owned and operated by Sonshine Media Network International. The station's studio is located at KJC Compound, North Rd., Brgy, Jagobiao, Mandaue, and its transmitter is located at Brgy. Cogon Pardo, Cebu City.

References

Christian radio stations in the Philippines
Sonshine Media Network International
Radio stations established in 1969
Radio stations in Metro Cebu